Jennifer Lombardo (born 24 June 1991) is an Italian weightlifter who won two gold medals at the 2018 Mediterranean Games.

Biography

See also
 Italian records in Olympic weightlifting
 Italy at the 2018 Mediterranean Games

References

External links
 

1991 births
Living people
Italian female weightlifters
Weightlifters of Fiamme Azzurre
Sportspeople from Palermo
Competitors at the 2018 Mediterranean Games
Mediterranean Games gold medalists for Italy
Mediterranean Games medalists in weightlifting
European Weightlifting Championships medalists
21st-century Italian women